Shitpyit is a village in Kyain Seikgyi Township, Kawkareik District, in the Karen State of Myanmar. It was formerly located along the Death Railway, however that section has since been dismantled.

References

External links
 "Shitpyit Map — Satellite Images of Phabya" Maplandia World Gazetteer
 

Populated places in Kayin State